4 Aquarii (abbreviated 4 Aqr) is a binary star system in the constellation Aquarius, located approximately 198 light years away from the Sun. 4 Aquarii is the Flamsteed designation. It is visible to the naked eye as a dim, yellow-white hued star with a combined apparent visual magnitude of 5.99. The system is moving closer to the Earth with a heliocentric radial velocity of −21.5 km/s.

This is a visual binary with an orbital period of 200.7 years and an eccentricity of 0.535. The magnitude 6.40 primary, designated component A, is an F-type subgiant star with a stellar classification of F7 IV, suggesting that it has exhausted the hydrogen at its core and evolved off the main sequence. It has a dynamically-measured mass 1.6 times that of the Sun and is radiating 11 times the Sun's luminosity from its photosphere at an effective temperature of 6,440 K. The magnitude 7.43 secondary, component B, is a suspected F-type main-sequence star of class F6 V. The pair are an estimated 1.6 billion years old.

References

F-type main-sequence stars
Binary stars
Aquarius (constellation)
Durchmusterung objects
Aquarii, 004
198571
102945
7982